Samuel Strong (born August 23, 1996) is an American soccer player.

Career

College & Amateur
Born in Santa Barbara, Strong played youth soccer with Santa Barbara Soccer Club and Real So Cal.  He also played one season of high school soccer with San Marcos High School in Santa Barbara where he graduated in 2014. Strong received a scholarship to play college soccer at UC Santa Barbara between 2015 and 2016, where he scored 2 goals in 30 appearances for the Gauchos. In November 2016, Strong was charged with felony count of assault with a deadly weapon and a misdemeanor count of reckless driving. Strong had seen a UCSB parking official placing a clamp on one of his tires in a campus parking lot and responded by getting into his car and driving away, nearly hitting the officer. He was subsequently dismissed from the UCSB soccer team. Strong later played one season of soccer at Coastal Carolina University in 2017.

While at college, Strong played with USL PDL side Ventura County Fusion in 2015 and 2017.

Professional
Strong signed with United Soccer League side Fresno FC on December 21, 2017, ahead of their inaugural season. He made his professional debut on July 25, 2018, starting in a 0-0 draw with Oklahoma City Energy. On December 2, 2019, Strong signed with Hartford Athletic.
During his time with Hartford Athletic, Strong was the 2020 club defender of the year as voted by the fans.

Strong signed with National Independent Soccer Association club San Diego 1904 FC on August 6, 2021, he scored on his debut in a match vs Maryland Bobcats on August 8, 2021.

Strong was announced as a signing for USL Championship expansion side Monterey Bay FC on February 14, 2022. Strong returned to Fresno on July 22, 2022, by way of a loan to Central Valley Fuego FC for the remainder of the 2022 USL League One season. His contract option was declined by Monterey Bay  at the end of the season.

References

External links 
 Fresno FC player profile
 

1996 births
Living people
Sportspeople from Santa Barbara, California
Soccer players from California
American soccer players
Association football defenders
UC Santa Barbara Gauchos men's soccer players
Coastal Carolina Chanticleers men's soccer players
Ventura County Fusion players
Fresno FC players
Hartford Athletic players
Monterey Bay FC players
Central Valley Fuego FC players
USL League Two players
USL Championship players
USL League One players